Hypselodoris violabranchia is a species of sea slug or dorid nudibranch, a marine gastropod mollusk in the family Chromodorididae.

Distribution
This nudibranch is known from the Hawaiian islands in the central Pacific Ocean.

Description
Hypselodoris violabranchia has a light brown body with white spots and lines running along its dorsum. The gills and rhinophores are purple or pink.

This species can reach a total length of at least 35 mm.

References

Chromodorididae
Gastropods described in 1999